Doradoquara is a Brazilian municipality located in the northwest of the state of Minas Gerais. Its population  was 1,912 people living in a total area of 313 km². The city belongs to the mesoregion of Triângulo Mineiro e Alto Paranaiba and to the microregion of Patrocínio.  It became a municipality in 1962.

Location
The municipality is located in the region of the Alto Paranaíba, on the edge of the Emborcação Reservoir, which dams up the Paranaíba River.  The elevation of the town center is 713 meters.  Highway connections are made by BR-352, which connects to MG-190.  Neighboring municipalities are: Catalão (N), Abadia dos Dourados (E) Monte Carmelo (S), and Grupiara (W).

Distances
Monte Carmelo: 47 km
Coromandel: 72 km
Patrocínio: 111 km
Patos de Minas: 183 km
Belo Horizonte: 514 km

Economic activities
The most important economic activities are cattle raising, commerce, and agriculture.  The GDP in 2005 was R$ R$13 million, with 19 million generated by services, 01 million generated by industry, and 04 million generated by agriculture.  Douradoquara is in the top tier of municipalities in the state with regard to economic and social development.   there were no banking agencies in the town.  There was a modest retail infrastructure serving the surrounding area of cattle and agricultural lands.  There were 255 automobiles in all of the municipality (2007), about one for every 07 inhabitants.

Douradoquara has a small municipal area and therefore little available land for agriculture.  In the rural area there were 241 establishments (2006) occupying 20,000 hectares (planted area—1,000 ha, and natural pasture—16,000 ha.).  About 420 persons were dependent on agriculture.  22 of the farms had tractors, a ratio of one in 10 farms.  There were 15,000 head of cattle in 2006.  The main crops were coffee, corn, rice, and soybeans.

Health and education
In 2006 there was one health clinic, one pre-school, one primary school and one middle school.

Municipal Human Development Index: 0.776 (2000)
State ranking: 131 out of 853 municipalities 
National ranking: 1,155 out of 5,138 municipalities 
Literacy rate: 87%
Life expectancy: 73 (average of males and females)

The highest ranking municipality in Minas Gerais in 2000 was Poços de Caldas with 0.841, while the lowest was Setubinha with 0.568.  Nationally the highest was São Caetano do Sul in São Paulo with 0.919, while the lowest was Setubinha.  In more recent statistics (considering 5,507 municipalities) Manari in the state of Pernambuco has the lowest rating in the country—0,467—putting it in last place.

References

See also
 List of municipalities in Minas Gerais

Municipalities in Minas Gerais